Walter Mark Ballinan (born March 3, 1987, in Davao City, Philippines), professionally known as Nonong Ballinan,  is a Filipino actor and comedian. He was first known as a contestant in Walang Tulugan with Master Showman German Molina Moreno, also known as Kuya Germs.

Early career
Nonong's 1st TV appearance was a former host in a children's variety program Chikiting Patrol aired on IBC 13 in 1989.  After 16 years of hiatus, Nonong returns as a contestant and also become a finalist of a My Funny One segment of a comedy noontime variety program, It's Showtime on ABS-CBN 2 (now A2Z 11 or Kapamilya Channel) in 2015.  The following years later, Nonong was a part regular cast of the sitcom Home Sweetie Home and currently part of Comedy Manila's homegrown talents, including former Funny One co-contestant Ryan Rems Sarita. He was first seen in the locally made webseries the Karsunsilyo Show.

Current career
Nonong was one of the four Pinoy Big Brother: Lucky 7's celebrity housemates revealed on 6 July 2016 in a report on TV Patrol. He was evicted on Day 23. He was later chosen by the Regulars to be the Third Lucky Star on Day 158. He returned on Day 178, but was later evicted on Day 213.

Nonong is currently one of the hosts of the podcast The KoolPals.

Nonong is also a game show host of SurpreSaya and a comedy trivia show, Sagot Ka Ni Kuya Jobert were both aired on CineMo Channel, with his co host longtime best friend Kuya Jobert Austria in 2018.

Personal life
Nonong is the cousin of the late Carmelito "Shalala" Reyes who was also a comedian, actor, co-host of Walang Tulugan With The Master Showman and radio personality for DZBB Super Radyo.

TV Shows
Chikiting Patrol, (IBC 13, 1989)
It's Showtime (ABS-CBN 2, 2015) - My Funny One Season 1 Contestant & Finalist
ASAP Natin 'To! (ABS-CBN 2, 2016 – present) - guest performer
Matanglawin (ABS-CBN 2, 2016) - guest host
Maynila (GMA 7, 2016 – 2020) - guest 
Funny Ka, Pare Ko (CineMo Channel, 2016–2019) - ????
Pinoy Big Brother: Lucky Season 7 (ABS-CBN 2, 2017) - Housemate
Goin' Bulilit (ABS-CBN 2, 2017–2019) - guest
Home Sweetie Home (ABS-CBN 2, 2017 – 2020) 
Magandang Buhay (ABS-CBN 2, 2017 – present) - guest
Banana Sundae (ABS-CBN 2, 2017 – 2020)
I Can See Your Voice (ABS-CBN 2, 2017) - guest
Tonight with Boy Abunda (ABS-CBN 2, 2017)
SurpreSaya (Cine Mo!, 2018–2019) - co host 
Ipaglaban Mo! (ABS-CBN 2, 2018–2020) - ?????
Sagot Ka ni Kuya Jobert  (Cine Mo!, 2018–2020) - Co Host
Dok Ricky, Pedia (ABS-CBN 2, 2018) - guest
Maalaala Mo Kaya (ABS-CBN 2, 2018) 
Gandang Gabi, Vice! (ABS-CBN 2, 2018) - guest
Swak na Swak (ABS-CBN 2, 2018) - guest host
FPJ's Ang Probinsyano (ABS-CBN 2, 2018 – 2022) - Ambo
Pinoy Big Brother: Otso (ABS-CBN 2, 2019) - guest jurado
Minute to Win It To Win It Last Tandem Standing (ABS-CBN 2, 2019)
Pinoy Big Brother: Connect (A2Z 11, 2020) - guest Zoom housemate
Iba Yan (A2Z 11, 2020–2021) - guest
Sunday 'Kada (TV5, 2020–2021) - guest
Lunch Out Loud (TV5, 2020–present) - guest contestant 
Bawal Na Game Show (TV5, 2020–2021) - guest contestant 
Fill in the Bank (TV5, 2020–2021) - guest contestant 
John en Ellen (TV5, 2021–2022) - guest
Sing Galing! (TV5, 2021–present) - guest performer contestant
Rolling In It Philippines (TV5, 2021–present)
The Wall Philippines  (TV5, 2021–present) - guest contestant
Masked Singer Pilipinas Season 2 (TV5, 2022)
PIEnalo Pinoy Games (PIE Channel, 2022–present) - Co Host
Happy ToGetHer (GMA Network, 2023) - guest

References

1987 births
Filipino male comedians
Filipino male television actors
People from Davao City
People from Quezon City
Pinoy Big Brother contestants
ABS-CBN personalities
Star Magic
Viva Artists Agency
Living people
Filipino male film actors